Kalan Sara (also Romanized as Kalān Sarā; also known as Kaland Sarā) is a village in Amlash-e Jonubi Rural District, in the Central District of Amlash County, Gilan Province, Iran. At the 2006 census, its population was 180, in 43 families.

References 

Populated places in Amlash County